Oasis is a census-designated place in northeastern Millard County, Utah, United States. The population was 75 at the 2010 census. Once the main rail shipping point in Millard County, Oasis declined in importance after the establishment of Delta, now the county's largest city.

Geography
The area consists of irrigated farmland on the edge of harsh desert, an oasis east of Swasey Mountain.

Climate
According to the Köppen Climate Classification system, Oasis has a semi-arid climate, abbreviated "BSk" on climate maps.

History
The Utah Southern Railroad Extension reached the Oasis area in October 1879, and by 1880 a settlement had begun to develop. Originally named Deseret Station, it became known as Oasis by 1885. In the early years, a small dam near Deseret provided all the irrigation water. Then in 1886, the Oasis and Riverside Canal Company and the Gunnison Bend Canal Company were organized, with ambitious plans to expand the cultivation of the surrounding land. The canal projects took years longer than expected, but supported steady population growth.

In the meantime, Oasis's main economic activity was as a railroad station. The precious metal mines of Frisco and Joy provided substantial freight traffic to the shipping point at Oasis. It also made an attractive location for shearing sheep, shipping livestock, and outfitting ranches. A small commercial center began to develop, with a general store, hotel, restaurant, saloon, bank, and other small businesses.

In 1891, the Deseret Ward of the Church of Jesus Christ of Latter-day Saints was divided into three congregations, for Hinckley, Deseret, and Oasis. It is from this time that Oasis is usually regarded as a separate community, an outgrowth of Deseret.

The location for the town that became Delta was chosen at a 1905 meeting of the Melville Irrigation Company held in Oasis. Originally named Burtner, the new town boomed. The Oasis Land and Water Company was organized in 1908 to develop water and land west of Burtner, but it failed due to flooding and financial problems in 1910. The Burtner project, on the other hand, was wildly successful, selling thousands of acres per month. In the 1910 census, Burtner's population was nearly double that of Oasis. Homesteaders streamed into the makeshift railroad depot, which by 1911 was the busiest in the county. That year Burtner was renamed Delta, and the railroad built a new Delta Station, the largest south of Salt Lake City. The centrally located Delta permanently supplanted Oasis in prominence.

Its railroad business gone, Oasis returned to agricultural industries. Alfalfa seed, lumber, and sugar beets were important products. A few businesses rounded up and trained Mustang horses for sale. A creamery was established in 1913.

A coal-fired power plant was built in Oasis in the 1920s. Small and inefficient, it served Deseret, Hinckley, and Delta until 1930.

The last years of the 1920s were hard on the entire region. Drought, insects, and frost damaged crop yields, and numerous farms closed down under financial difficulties. The Oasis State Bank went out of business in 1928. Continuing drought conditions in the 1930s severely reduced the available irrigation water, and large tracts of farmland in the Oasis area had to be abandoned.

In June 1983, about 400 people in the Deseret–Oasis area were evacuated when the Gunnison Bend dam and the DMAD dam above it failed due to that year's excessive spring runoff.

Demographics

As of the census of 2010, there were 75 people living in the CDP. There were 28 housing units. The racial makeup was 78.7% White, 4.0% American Indian and Alaska Native, 14.7% from some other race, and 2.7% from two or more races. Hispanic or Latino of any race were 17.3% of the population.

See also

 List of census-designated places in Utah

References

External links

Census-designated places in Utah
Populated places established in 1880
Census-designated places in Millard County, Utah
1880 establishments in Utah Territory
Great Basin National Heritage Area